Prague is the capital of the Czech Republic.

Prague may also refer to:

Places
 Praha, Slovakia, a village in Lučenec District
 Prague, Nebraska, USA
 Prague, Oklahoma, USA
 New Prague, Minnesota, USA
 Praha, Texas, USA

People
 Edith Prague (1925-2021), American politician

Other
 The Prague Offensive, the last major European battle of World War II
 Infant Jesus of Prague, a famous statue of Jesus located in Prague
 Prague (novel), a 2002 novel by Arthur Phillips
 Prague fatale, a 2011 novel by Philip Kerr
 Prague (2006 film), a 2006 Danish film, starring Mads Mikkelsen
 Prague (1992 film), a 1992 UK/French film, directed by Ian Sellar
 Prague (2013 film), a Hindi romance film
 "Prague", a 1992 song by Mega City Four,covered by Muse
 Mozart's Symphony No. 38 (Mozart), subtitled Prague
 Prague (band), a Japanese rock band